Shaker Village Historic District is a historic district between Fairmount and Lomond Boulevards, and Green, Warrensville Center, Becket, and Coventry Roads in Shaker Heights, Ohio. The district comprises roughly seventy percent of the city of Shaker Heights.

The district was largely constructed between the late nineteenth century and early twentieth century. The area was once home to a large Shaker population. The district was added to the National Register of Historic Places in 1984.

See also 
Shakertown

References

Historic districts in Cuyahoga County, Ohio
Shaker Heights, Ohio
Historic districts on the National Register of Historic Places in Ohio
National Register of Historic Places in Cuyahoga County, Ohio